Hanstruepera neustonica is a Gram-negative, strictly aerobic, rod-shaped, non-spore-forming and non-motile bacterium from the genus of Hanstruepera.

References 

Flavobacteria
Bacteria described in 2015